Trailer Park is the solo debut album by British singer Beth Orton. Combining folk, electronica, and trip hop elements, it earned Orton two BRIT Award nominations. One single from the album was the opening track, "She Cries Your Name", which previously appeared in a different form on William Orbit's album Strange Cargo Hinterland. All songs were co-written by Orton except for a cover version of Phil Spector's "I Wish I Never Saw the Sunshine." The album was among the first to fuse elements of 1960s and 1970s folk with modern electronica and trip hop.

An expanded two-disc Legacy Edition was released internationally on 10 March 2009.

Critical reception

Chris Jones of BBC Music called Trailer Park "a very English record" and wrote that "only on the poppier 'Don't Need a Reason' or 'Someone's Daughter' does she go badly wrong."

Track listing
All tracks written by Ted Barnes, Ali Friend, and Beth Orton except where noted.

Charts

Certifications and sales

References

Beth Orton albums
1996 albums
Albums produced by Victor Van Vugt